Coleophora aularia is a moth of the family Coleophoridae. It is found in the Canary Islands, Tunisia, Egypt, Sudan, Oman and Saudi Arabia.

References

aularia
Moths described in 1924
Moths of Africa
Moths of Asia